Artashumara Akkadian), brother of Tushratta and son of Shuttarna II, briefly held the throne of Mitanni in the fourteenth century BC.

Reign
He is known only from a single mention in a tablet found in Tell Brak "Artassumara the king, son of Shuttarna the king" and a mention in Amarna letter 17. According to the later, after the death of Shuttarna II he briefly took power but was then murdered (by someone named Tuhi) and succeeded by his brother Tushratta

See also

Mitanni

References

Hurrian kings
14th-century BC rulers